Austrarchaea aleenae is a species of spider in the family Archaeidae. It is endemic to south-east Queensland, Australia where it may be found in the Bulburin National Park and Kalpowar State Forest.

References 

Spiders described in 2011
Archaeidae